The Ghauri–I (official codename: Hatf–V Ghauri–I) is a land-based surface-to-surface medium-range ballistic missile, in current service with the Pakistan Army's Strategic Forces Command— a subordinate command of Strategic Plans Division.

Influenced from the design of Nodong-1 of North Korea, its extensive modification and engineering took place in Kahuta Research Laboratories (KRL) in 1990s with an objective of developing an electronic system that uses a single stage liquid fuel rocket motor to carry a payload of 700 kg to a range of 1,500 km. This is enough to reach most, if not all of India. Two variants of the Ghauri were produced under the secretive missile research programme started in 1987 and the development of a third variant was cancelled.

The missile is named after Shahabuddin Muhammad Ghauri, while the "Hatf" designation originates from the name of the sword or lance of the Islamic prophet Muhammad.

History

Codename

Upon its development, the missile was named after the 12th century Sultan Shahabuddin Ghauri, by a senior scientist who worked on the program with a keen interest in medieval history. Sultan Muhammad Ghauri, who successfully campaigned in the northwestern region of India between 1176 and 1182, but was defeated in his first battle in northern India by Indian King Prithviraj Chauhan; but Ghauri returned in June 1192 when he defeated Prithviraj. He captured Delhi in 1199, but established his kingdom formally in 1206.

However, the JS HQ has officially codenamed the missile "Hatf–5 (Ghauri–I); the Hatf codename originates from the name of the sword or lance of Muhammad.

Design and development
 
According to the American intelligence estimates in 1999, the Ghauri–I is influenced and its design development is based on the Rodong-1 missile of North Korea. According to the American Federation of Atomic Scientists, the Ghauri–I is believed to inherit a warhead spin-up mechanism from the Rodong 1 and it is stated that this feature could improve accuracy up to 190m CEP— although this is still debatable. The mechanism involves using steering vanes to spin the missile after 100 seconds of flight time. After 110 seconds, the rocket motor stops and the warhead separates from the rocket motor. The warhead then enters a more stable re-entry trajectory due to its spinning motion. Warhead accuracy would be further enhanced if the Ghauri's inertial navigation system is capable of being updated by GPS satellite signals.

By Pakistan's own unofficial admission, the technology transfer took place in 1990s in return of the instructions on enrichment methods for uranium Not much has been publicized as controversy surrounds the claim that North Korean nuclear efforts were well advanced before the instructions on enrichment methods uranium were provided.

According to the Pakistani military reports, the original design of the missile was flawed and the missile's frontal conic nose section material burned up due to generated shock waves and hypersonic effect on re-entry during its first test flight in 1998. High stress and high temperature shift caused the material to melt during the re-entry while its vintage electronic systems, engine system, and propellant had to be replaced. Eventually, the conic nose section was redesigned by rounding the cone which allowed the missile to travel from subsonic flow to supersonic flow. The KRL, with assistance from the NESCOM, DESTO, and NDC, engaged in heavy reengineering of much of the missile electronic system.

The liquid fuel systems are incapable of storing fuel for any long period of time; the Ghauri–I requires fueling for several hours before launch, making it vulnerable to a first strike. It is believed that this is why Pakistan has not pursued liquid fuel systems other than the Ghauri–I and Ghauri-II. It also makes it less likely that the Ghaur-I would be armed with a nuclear warhead, although it has been stated that it is capable of being loaded with "all types" of warheads. Contrast to the Shaheen program that went under the joint conjecture of Pakistan's Air Force and the Army, the Ghauri program was designed for the Pakistan Army which was setting to accuracy goal for a highly accurate missile designed to strike high-value targets.

The solid-fueled Shaheen-IA is believed to be an alternative missile system for the Ghauri–I. However, it has been stated that the Ghauri–I has the advantage of lower cost than solid-fueled systems. This makes it particularly useful in testing launch and control systems. It has been speculated that the Ghauri–I design may serve as a starting point for a future Pakistani space launch vehicle.

Operational history and tests

The Ghauri–I was first test fired at 7:25hrs on 6 April 1998 from the Tilla Test Range near Malute, Jhelum Cantt which is about 76 mi (122.31 km) south of the Islamabad. It was fired from a transporter erector launcher and traveled  in a flight lasting 9 minutes and 58 seconds. It climbed to a height of 350 km before turning in the direction of its planned impact area in the desert of Balochistan where it hit the designated target at 7:33hrs. At the time, Pakistani military's information source, the ISPR stated that the missile hit its designated target in the desert of Balochistan. Official Pakistani military reports revealed that the first test was not successful because the missile's conic nose melted due to tremendous amount of heat during the re-entry phase of its flight.

After redesigning nose by rounding it to avoid the hypersonic effect but traveling from subsonic to supersonic flow, Ghauri–I was successfully test fired for second time as then-Prime Minister Zafarullah Jamali witnessed the test. On 21 December 2010, the Ghauri–I was again successfully test fired for a third time. On 12 November 2012, the Ghauri–I was successfully test fired for a fourth occasion by the Strategic Missile Group of the Army Strategic Force Command. The test-flight was monitored by the new Strategic Command and Control Support System (SCCSS) and is believed to have been geared towards testing the SCCSS rather than the missile itself.

On 15 April 2015, Ghauri-I was again test fired from Tilla Test Range; it was fired from the transporter erector launcher.

See also

 PGM-11 Redstone–U.S. missile with similar design
 Ballistic missile
 Liquid fuel rocket
Related developments
 Ghauri-II
 Ghauri-III
Related lists
 List of missiles

References

External links
 CSIS Missile Threat – Hatf 5
 FAS.org article – Hatf-5
 DefenceJournal.com article – Pakistani Missile Technology
 FAS.org – Pakistan test-fires Ghauri missile 

North Korea–Pakistan relations
Medium-range ballistic missiles of Pakistan
Military equipment introduced in the 2000s